Claudia Elizabeth Bojórquez Javier (born 19 October 1970) is a Mexican politician affiliated with the PRD. She currently serves as Deputy of the LXII Legislature of the Mexican Congress representing Tabasco.

References

1970 births
Living people
Politicians from Tabasco
Women members of the Chamber of Deputies (Mexico)
Party of the Democratic Revolution politicians
21st-century Mexican politicians
21st-century Mexican women politicians
People from Tenosique
Members of the Congress of Tabasco
Deputies of the LXII Legislature of Mexico
Members of the Chamber of Deputies (Mexico) for Tabasco